List of rivers of Massachusetts (U.S. state).

All Massachusetts rivers flow to the Atlantic Ocean. The list is arranged by drainage basin from north to south, with respective tributaries indented under each larger stream's name, arranged travelling upstream along the larger stream.

By drainage

Gulf of Maine north of Cape Ann
Blackwater River
Little River

Merrimack River
Back River (Merrimack River tributary)
Powwow River
Back River (Lake Attitash)
Back River (Powwow River tributary)
Artichoke River
Indian River
East Meadow River
Little River
Cochichewick River
Shawsheen River
Spicket River
Concord River
Assabet River
Sudbury River
Beaver Brook
Salmon Brook
Nashua River
Nissitissit River
Squannacook River
Still River
South Nashua River
Quinapoxet River
Stillwater River
North Nashua River
Whitman River
Phillips Brook
Souhegan River (New Hampshire)
South Branch Souhegan River
Parker River
Little River
Mill River
Rowley River
Roger Island River
Egypt River
Eagle Hill River
Ipswich River
Miles River
Martins Brook
Skug River
Castle Neck River
Essex River
Farm Creek
Walker Creek
Annisquam River
Jones River
Little River
Mill River

Massachusetts Bay
Danvers River
North River
Bass River
Forest River
Saugus River
Pines River
Mill River
Mystic River
Chelsea Creek
Island End River
Malden River
Alewife Brook
Little River
Aberjona River

Charles River
Muddy River
Stop River
Mill River
West Branch Charles River
Stony Brook (Waltham)
Stony Brook (Boston) (covered culvert)
Neponset River
Canton River, a.k.a. East Branch Neponset River
Mother Brook
Weymouth Fore River
Monatiquot River
Cochato River
Farm River
Blue Hill River
Weymouth Back River
Fresh River
Mill River
Old Swamp River
Weir River
Crooked Meadow River
Plymouth River
Bound Brook (In 1640, Bound Brook formed the border between the Massachusetts Bay and Plymouth colonies.)
Aaron River
North River
East Branch North River
Indian Head River
Drinkwater River
West Branch North River
South River

Cape Cod Bay

Green Harbor River
Back River
Pine Point River
Great Wood Island River
Little Wood Island River
Duck Hill River
Bourne Wharf River
Bluefish River
Jones River
Town Brook
Eel River
Boat Meadow River
Pamet River
Little Pamet River
Herring River (Wellfleet, Massachusetts)

Nantucket Sound
Mitchell River
Oyster Pond River
Andrews River
Red River
Swan Pond River
Bass River
Parkers River
Centerville River
Bumps River
Marstons Mill River
Little River
Santuit River
Mashpee River
Quashnet River
Childs River
Seapit River
Coonamesset River

Martha's Vineyard
Tiasquam River

Buzzards Bay
Wild Harbor River
Pocasset River
Back River
Wareham River
Crooked River
Broad Marsh River
Agawam River
Wankinco River
Weweantic River
Sippican River
East Branch Sippican River
West Branch Sippican River
Mattapoisett River
Nasketucket River
Acushnet River
Keene River
Little River
Slocums River
Paskamanset River
Westport River
East Branch Westport River
Shingle Island River
Copicut River
West Branch Westport River

Narragansett Bay

Taunton River
Quequechan River
Assonet River
Cedar Swamp River
Segreganset River
Three Mile River
Rumford River
Wading River
Mill River
Snake River
Canoe River
Forge River
Cotley River
Nemasket River
Winnetuxet River
Matfield River
Satucket River
Poor Meadow Brook
Shumatuscacant River
Stream River
Salisbury Plain River
Town River
Hockomock River
Lees River
Cole River
Kickamuit River
Warren River (Rhode Island)
Barrington River (Rhode Island)
Runnins River
Palmer River
East Branch Palmer River
West Branch Palmer River

Seekonk River (Rhode Island)
Ten Mile River
Wilde River
Sevenmile River
Bungay River
Blackstone River
Abbott Run
Peters River
Mill River
Branch River (Rhode Island)
Clear River (Rhode Island)
Nipmuc River (Rhode Island)
Chockalog River
West River
Mumford River
Quinsigamond River
Middle River
Kettle Brook

Long Island Sound

Thames River (Connecticut)
Shetucket River (Connecticut)
Quinebaug River
French River
Little River
South Fork Little River
Connecticut River
Farmington River (Connecticut)
East Branch Farmington River (Connecticut)
Hubbard River
West Branch Farmington River
Clam River
Buck River
Fall River (Farmington River tributary)
Scantic River
Westfield River
Great Brook
Little River (Westfield River, South)
West Branch Westfield River
Middle Branch Westfield River
Little River (Westfield River, North)
Swift River
North Branch Swift River
Mill River (Springfield, Massachusetts)
North Branch Mill River
South Branch Mill River
Chicopee River
Quaboag River
East Brookfield River
Sevenmile River
Cranberry River
Fivemile River
Ware River
Swift River
Quabbin Reservoir
West Branch Swift River
East Branch Swift River
East Branch Fever Brook
West Branch Fever Brook
Middle Branch Swift River
Prince River
Burnshirt River
East Branch Ware River
West Branch Ware River
Stony Brook
Manhan River
North Branch Manhan River
Mill River (Northampton, Massachusetts)
East Branch Mill River
West Branch Mill River
Fort River
Mill River (Hatfield, Massachusetts)
Mill River (Hadley, Massachusetts)
Sawmill River
Deerfield River
Green River (Deerfield River tributary)
South River
Bear River
North River
East Branch North River
West Branch North River
Chickley River
Cold River
Green River (Cold River tributary)
Fall River (Connecticut River tributary)
Millers River
Tully River
East Branch Tully River
West Branch Tully River
Otter River
Priest Brook
North Branch Millers River

Housatonic River
Blackberry River (Connecticut)
Whiting River
Konkapot River
Umpachene River
Green River
Williams River
Hop Brook
Mad River
West Branch Housatonic River
Southwest Branch Housatonic River
East Branch Housatonic River

New York Harbor
Hudson River (New York)
Kinderhook Creek
Hoosic River
Green River
North Branch Hoosic River

Alphabetically
 

Aaron River
Abbott Run
Aberjona River
Acushnet River
Agawam River
Alewife Brook
Andrews River
Annisquam River
Artichoke River
Assabet River
Assonet River
Back River (Buzzards Bay)
Back River (Lake Attitash)
Back River (Massachusetts Bay)
Back River (Merrimack River tributary)
Back River (Powwow River tributary)
Barrington River
Bass River (Danvers River tributary)
Bass River (Nantucket Sound)
Batchelor Brook
Bear River
Beaver Brook
Blackstone River
Blackwater River
Blue Hill River
Bluefish River
Boat Meadow River
Bourne Wharf River
Broad Marsh River
Buck River
Bumps River
Bungay River
Burnshirt River
Canoe River
Castle Neck River
Cedar Swamp River
Centerville River
Charles River
Chickley River
Chicopee River
Childs River
Chockalog River
Clam River
Cochato River
Cochichewick River
Cold River
Cole River
Concord River
Connecticut River
Coonamesset River
Copicut River
Cotley River
Cranberry River
Crooked Meadow River
Crooked River
Deerfield River
Drinkwater River
Duck Hill River
Eagle Hill River
East Branch Green River
East Branch Housatonic River
East Branch Mill River
East Branch Neponset River
East Branch North River
East Branch Palmer River
East Branch Sippican River
East Branch Swift River
East Branch Tully River
East Branch Ware River
East Branch Westport River
East Brookfield River
East Meadow River
Eel River
Egypt River
Essex River
Fall River (Connecticut River tributary)
Fall River (Farmington River tributary)
Farm River
Five Mile River
Forest River
Forge River
Fort River
French River
Fresh River
Great Brook (Westfield River tributary)
Green Harbor River
Green River (Cold River tributary)
Green River (Deerfield River tributary)
Green River (Hoosic River tributary)
Green River (Housatonic River tributary)
Herring River
Hockomock River
Hoosic River/Hoosac River
Housatonic River
Hubbard River
Indian Head River
Indian River
Ipswich River
Jones River (Annisquam River tributary)
Jones River (Kingston Bay)
Keene River
Kettle Brook
Kickamuit River
Kinderhook Creek
Konkapot River
Lees River
Little Pamet River
Little River (Alewife Brook tributary)
Little River (Annisquam River tributary)
Little River (Blackwater River tributary)
Little River (Cotuit Bay)
Little River (French River tributary)
Little River (Merrimack River tributary)
Little River (Parker River tributary)
Little River (Slocums River tributary)
Little River (Westfield River, North)
Little River (Westfield River, South)
Little Wood Island River
Long Pond River
Mad River
Malden River
Manhan River
Marstons Mill River
Mashpee River
Matfield River
Mattapoisett River
Merrimack River
Middle Branch Swift River
Middle Branch Westfield River
Middle River
Miles River
Mill River (Annisquam River tributary)
Mill River (Charles River tributary)
Mill River (Hadley, Massachusetts)
Mill River (Hatfield, Massachusetts)
Mill River (Massachusetts–Rhode Island)
Mill River (Northampton, Massachusetts)
Mill River (Parker River tributary)
Mill River (Saugus River tributary)
Mill River (Springfield, Massachusetts)
Mill River (Taunton River tributary)
Mill River (Weymouth Back River tributary)
Millers River
Mitchell River
Monatiquot River
Mother Brook
Muddy River
Mumford River
Mystic River
Nashua River
Nasketucket River
Nemasket River
Neponset River
Nissitissit River
North Branch Hoosic River
North Branch Manhan River
North Branch Mill River
North Branch Millers River
North Branch Swift River
North Nashua River
North River (Danvers River tributary)
North River (Deerfield River tributary)
North River (Massachusetts Bay)
Old Swamp River
Otter River
Oyster Pond River
Palmer River
Pamet River
Parker River
Parkers River
Paskamanset River
Peters River
Phillips Brook
Pine Point River
Pines River
Plymouth River
Pocasset River
Poor Meadow Brook
Powwow River
Priest Brook
Prince River
Quaboag River
Quashnet River
Quequechan River
Quinapoxet River
Quinebaug River
Quinsigamond River
Quiquechan River
Red River
Roger Island River
Rowley River
Rumford River
Runnins River
Salisbury Plain River
Salmon Brook
Santuit River
Satucket River
Saugus River
Sawmill River
Scantic River
Schneelock Brook
Seapit River
Segreganset River
Seven Mile River (East Brookfield River tributary)
Sevenmile River (Tenmile River tributary)
Shawsheen River
Shingle Island River
Shumatuscacant River
Sippican River
Skug River
Snake River
South Branch Mill River
South Branch Souhegan River
South Fork Little River
South Nashua River
South River (Deerfield River tributary)
South River (Massachusetts Bay)
Southwest Branch Housatonic River
Spicket River
Squannacook River
Still River
Stillwater River
Stony Brook
Stop River
Stream River
Sudbury River
Swan Pond River
Swift River (Ware River tributary)
Swift River (Westfield River tributary)
Sudbury River
Taunton River
Ten Mile River
Three Mile River
Tiasquam River
Town Brook
Town River
Tully River
Umpachene River
Wading River
Walker Creek
Wankinco River
Ware River
Wareham River
Weir River
West Branch Charles River
West Branch Farmington River
West Branch Green River
West Branch Housatonic River
West Branch Mill River
West Branch North River
West Branch Palmer River
West Branch Sippican River
West Branch Swift River
West Branch Tully River
West Branch Ware River
West Branch Westfield River
West Branch Westport River
West River
Westfield River
Westport River
Weweantic River
Weymouth Back River
Weymouth Fore River
Whiting River
Whitman River
Wild Harbor River
Williams River
Winnetuxet River

See also
List of rivers in the United States
Miskatonic River

References
USGS Geographic Names Information Service
Professor Higbee's Stream Map of New England. (1995). Vivid Publishing, Inc..

External links

 "Assessment Data for the State of Massachusetts Year 2006", Environmental Protection Agency.

Massachusetts
Rivers